The 2019–20 Georgia bulldogs basketball team represented the University of Georgia during the 2019–20 NCAA Division I men's basketball season. The team's head coach was Tom Crean, in his second year at Georgia. They played their home games at Stegeman Coliseum in Athens, Georgia as members of the Southeastern Conference. They finished the season 16–16, 5–13 in SEC play to finish in 13th place. They defeated Ole Miss in the first round of the SEC tournament and were set to take on Florida in the second round. However, the remainder of the SEC Tournament was cancelled amid the COVID-19 pandemic.

Previous season
The Bulldogs finished the 2018–19 season 11–21, 2–16 in SEC play to finish in thirteenth place. As the No. 13 seed in the SEC tournament, they were defeated by Missouri in the first round.

Offseason

Departures

Incoming transfers

2019 recruiting class

Preseason

SEC media poll
The SEC media poll was released on October 15, 2019.

Preseason All-SEC teams
The Bulldogs had one player selected to the preseason all-SEC teams.

First Team

Anthony Edwards

Roster

Schedule and results

|-
!colspan=12 style=| Exhibition

|-
!colspan=12 style=| Non-conference regular season

|-
!colspan=12 style=| SEC regular season

|-
!colspan=9 style=| SEC tournament

|- style="background:#bbbbbb"
| style="text-align:center"|March 12, 20203:30 pm, SECN
| style="text-align:center"| (13)
| vs. (5) FloridaSecond round
| colspan=5 rowspan=1 style="text-align:center"|Cancelled due to the COVID-19 pandemic
| style="text-align:center"|Bridgestone ArenaNashville, TN
|-

Schedule Source:'Schedule Source:'

References

Georgia Bulldogs basketball seasons
Georgia
Georgia
Georgia